Nadezhda Shkolkina (May 12, 1970, Saransk) is a Russian political figure and deputy of the 5th, 6th, and 8th State Dumas. In 2010, she was granted a Candidate of Sciences in Economics degree. 

From 1992 to 1998, Shkolkina worked in various commercial enterprises. In 2006-2010, she headed Public Council under the Ministry of Agriculture. From 2010 to 2011, she was a member of the Civic Chamber of the Russian Federation. In 2007, she joined the United Russia. In 2007, 2011, and 2021, Shkolkina was elected deputy of the 5th, 6th, and 8th State Dumas, respectively.

In 2013, Dissernet accused Shkolkina of plagiarizing parts of her Candidate of Sciences dissertation.

References

1970 births
Living people
United Russia politicians
21st-century Russian politicians
Eighth convocation members of the State Duma (Russian Federation)
Sixth convocation members of the State Duma (Russian Federation)
Fifth convocation members of the State Duma (Russian Federation)